The Iron Curtain was the boundary dividing Europe in the Cold War.

Iron Curtain may also refer to:
Safety curtain, in theatres
Iron Curtain (countermeasure), an active protection system
Iron Curtain (football), the defensive line of Rangers Football Club in the 1940s and 1950s
Iron Curtain (musical), a comedy musical about the Soviet Union
The Iron Curtain (film), a 1948 film
The Iron Curtain device, a fictional superweapon in the Red Alert series
Irumbu Thirai (1960 film) (Tamil for Iron Curtain), a 1960 film
Iron Curtain: The Crushing of Eastern Europe, a book by Anne Applebaum

See also
Curtain (disambiguation)
Steel Curtain, a phrase used to describe the NFL's Pittsburgh Steelers' defense during the 1970s
Bamboo Curtain, Cold War expression
 Behind the Iron Curtain (disambiguation)
 EV13 The Iron Curtain Trail, cycling route along the Iron Curtain